Laureano de Torres y Ayala (1645–1722), Marquis of Casa Torres and Knight of Santiago, was a Spanish military officer and royal governor of La Florida (1693–1699) and of Cuba (1708–1711 and 1713–1716). During his administration in Florida, he completed the construction of the Castillo de San Marcos fortress in St. Augustine (San Agustín), the provincial capital.

Biography 
Laureano José de Torres Ayala a Duadros Castellanos was born in 1645 in Seville, Spain,  and grew up in Madrid, where his parents settled when he was still a small child. Ayala came from a noble family, being the son of Tomás de Torres y Ayala and Elvira de Quadros Castellanos.  His father was a judge in Seville in 1649 and mayor, governor and Captain General of Mérida and La Grita (in Venezuela). He had three brothers: Pedro Ignacio, Cristóbal and Diego Torres Ayala y Quadros. In his youth he joined the Spanish army.

In June 1693, Ayala joined a Spanish expedition in La Florida which passed through what is now Okaloosa County and crossed the natural bridge of the spring-fed Chipola River. On September 21, 1693, Torres y Ayala was appointed Governor of Spanish Florida, replacing Diego de Quiroga y Losada.

Like the previous governors since 1672, Torres y Ayala oversaw construction of the Castillo de San Marcos, completed in 1695. During his administration, the San Carlos de los Chacatos mission was attacked by Alibamu Indian warriors in 1696. In 1698, the first European settlement (Presidio Santa Maria de Galve) and the first fort (Fort San Carlos de Austria) were founded at the site of present-day Pensacola. He held the post of governor of Florida until 1699, when he returned to Spain, being replaced by José de Zúñiga y la Cerda.

Between 1704 and 1707, Ayala fought in the War of the Spanish Succession in Europe. On January 18, 1708, Ayala was appointed Governor General of Cuba, and worked mainly at Havana, where he was principally concerned with the island's economic problems and defenses. A Spanish official and landowner, Orri, had proposed a project to sell tobacco for the Cuban government. Ayala thought that the idea would be advantageous to Spain and lent the plan his full support, but had to contend with the opposition of the speculators who legally bypassed customs duties when they shipped tobacco to other ports in America and Spain. The government tobacco monopoly was very successful, and Ayala was rewarded with the title of Marquis de Casa-Torre, notwithstanding his disputes with Lieutenant-auditor Jose Fernandez de Córdoba.

On February 18, 1711, the oidor (judge of the Real Audiencia) Pablo Cavera had Ayala temporarily suspended while the matter was investigated. After sailing to Spain to explain his case, Ayala was reinstated as governor of Cuba on February 14, 1713. The administration of Governor Ayala was a period of relative peace. On June 9, 1714, he ordered the construction of a hospital for lepers in Havana; after collecting several large donations, he began construction of the Hospital de San Lazaro and its church on a plot located near Havana city. Ayala founded the city of Santiago del Bejucal. The tobacco industry expanded greatly during his governorship, and the tobacco plant began to be widely cultivated in the Vuelta Abajo district.

Ayala died in 1722 in Havana, Cuba.

Personal life 
Laureano de Torres y Ayala married the Cuban Catalina Gertrudis Bayona y Chacón on August 5, 1687 in Havana. He had three children: Tomasa María, Laureano Antonio José, and Sor Manuela de San Laureano.

Popular Culture
Torres appears as a major antagonist and a Grand Master of the fictional Templar Order in the 2013 video game Assassin's Creed IV: Black Flag.

References

External links 
 – Governor of Cuba, (in Spanish)

1645 births
1722 deaths
People from Havana
Spanish explorers of North America
Cuban people of Spanish descent
Royal Governors of La Florida
Cuban politicians
Governors of Cuba
Knights of Santiago